The Intercollegiate Taiwanese American Students Association (ITASA) (Chinese (Traditional): 美國台裔學生協會) was established by a group of students in the East Coast and Midwest of the United States to grow the Taiwanese American college community. ITASA is a national 501(c)(3) non-profit organization staffed by students and recent graduates to serve their peers and their respective campuses. ITASA provides the spaces for networking, community building, leadership training, and identity-building which are critical to the future of the Taiwanese American generation.

History
On July 4, 1990, a group of second generation Taiwanese Americans converged on the campuses of Cornell University as a part of the Taiwanese American Conference/East Coast (TAC/EC) at Donlon Lounge to commence discussions regarding an intercollegiate Taiwanese Council. "We nicknamed ourselves ‘seeds,’ a term used as the agents to organically grow the Taiwanese community including a Taiwanese American Collegiate Network,” recalls Winston Yang, the organizer for the 1991 meeting of the ITASA “seeds.” During the 1991 meeting, about twenty representatives from schools like Harvard, Columbia, Yale, University of Pennsylvania, Smith, Rutgers, and NYU converged on the campuses of Columbia University for three days.

The first ITASA East Coast Conference took place at the University of Pennsylvania in 1992 (ITSA), followed by Yale University in 1993.  The first Midwest ITASA conference took place the same year at Purdue University. From then on, ITASA held two conferences annually on the East Coast and the Midwest, until 1999, when the first annual West Coast Conference was held at the University of California, Berkeley, thus completing the three-region conference series which continues today.

In the beginning, ITASA conferences were self-financed and catered by students' own families. Attendance ranged from 35 to 300 people.

On February 17, 1998, ITASA was formally incorporated as a 501(c)(3) religious/cultural tax-exempt nonprofit corporation in Delaware by Incorporator Kok-ui Lim with the help of many other people, including Jimmy Ho, Audrey Jean, Cathy Hsu, Tim Chng, Rolla Chng, et al.

The founders of ITASA presided for several years and had tried several ways to generate successors. They created a steering committee of positions including the quaintly termed "Computer Operator" and recruited interested students from schools all over the nation to help run the organization. Many members of the steering committee have noted that they lacked the experience and motivation to run a geographically dispersed student organization. Staff experience increased with the command of Jimmy, Audrey, Cathy, and others. This new generation of ITASA leaders, all recent conference directors on the East Coast, helped to secure ITASA's financial and organizational future by facilitating the incorporation of ITASA into a 501(c)(3) corporation and investing ITASA's involvement on the regional level. They also developed ITASA's nascent web presence, centralized fundraising strategies, and brought greater structure to the national calendar of events and board responsibilities. From then on, the Board of Directors emerged from a group of veteran officers and new officers emerged from the conference leaders. Today, the ITASA National Board is selected every June from a pool of applicants from across the United States.

In 1998, Taiwanese American students at Harvard University, the Massachusetts Institute of Technology, and Tufts University established the Boston Intercollegiate Taiwanese Students Association (BITSA) to serve the many campuses in the Boston area. BITSA works closely with ITASA at targeting its thriving community of local students.

In 1999, the first Annual Leadership Retreat was held at the University of Pennsylvania.

In 1999, ITASA "Regional Representatives" were added to the leadership structure. In 2003, Regional Representatives would become Regional Governors with more defined responsibilities.

In the spring of 1999, students at the University of California at Berkeley undertook the first West Coast Conference, bringing ITASA to three major regions across the United States.

In 2000, the Leadership Retreat Program was expanded to include the Midwest and West Coast Leadership Retreats. The first Midwest Leadership Retreat was held at Northwestern University with the West Coast Leadership Retreat hosted by Pomona College.

In 2001, ITASA's leadership structure was changed to its current form of a National Board overseen by a Board of Directors.

In 2003, Governor-led Regional Boards were established, replacing the single Regional Representative in each region and District Chairs took charge over the Districts, which were subdivided from the Regions.

In 2006, the first annual ITASA Winter Mixer in New York, NY was held.

In 2010, the Philanthropy Department was created. The Philanthropy Department plans and implements projects designed to further ITASA's mission statement.

In 2018, the Programs and Philanthropy departments were merged, as were the Marketing and Public Relations department.

In 2020, the External Affairs Department was created. The External Affairs Department aims to advocate for Taiwanese/ Taiwanese American rights representing the voice of college students across the US. Marketing and Public Relations Departments were once again separated into two departments. Marketing focuses on social media online presence and Public Relations focuses on outreach. The National Board introduced the co-national director system for most of the departments.

Approach
While setting goals, the National Board has identified 5 levels of student activism. The community at large needed more resources to educate, unite, and equip the general body of Taiwanese Americans across the United States. The campuses at each school needed support in getting linked to the nationwide network and founding new chapters of Taiwanese American student groups. The individual students required more information, ideas, contacts, outlets, and guidelines for personal and collective activism.

Programs

ITASA Grants
ITASA Grants was started during the 2018–2019 Academic Year following various inquiries about whether ITASA can help fund chapter events. The program comes as a combination of the previous Regional Grants Initiative and the ITASA Awards program. For the Spring 2019 Academic Term, ITASA helped to fund 3 different events at the University of Chicago, University of Texas at Austin, and Binghamton University for a grand total of $1,000.

Conference timeline

References

Non-profit organizations based in Illinois
Taiwanese-American culture
Organizations established in 1998
501(c)(3) organizations
Student organizations in the United States
Ethnic student organizations